The 22449 / 22450 Poorvottar Sampark Kranti Express is one of the Sampark Kranti Express trains of Indian Railways. It connects New Delhi, the capital city of India with Guwahati, the capital city of Assam. The train is named as Poorvottar Express since it connects New Delhi with the north east region of the country, known as Poorvottar in Hindi.

Service

Guwahati-New Delhi 22449/22450 (from 1 April 2020), Poorvottar Sampark Kranti Express takes approximately 31 hours to complete a distance of 2284 km. En route it stops at Goalpara Town, New Bongaigaon, New Jalpaiguri, Katihar, Patliputra Junction, Mughalsarai Junction, Allahabad and Kanpur in both up and down journey, with technical halt at Barauni Junction.  This train belongs to Northern Railway zone of the Indian Railways. Usually late departure from New Delhi Station.

Coaches
The train consists of one composite 1A/2A coach (HA-1), two 2A coaches (A-1/A-2), six 3A coaches (B-1/B-2/B-3/B-4/B-5/B-6), six sleeper coaches (S-1/S-2/S-3/S-4/S-5/S-6), one pantry car (P-C), four general coaches, one luggage cum generator car (EOG) and one luggage cum guard cum second seating (SLR) . Total coach count is 22. On 28 November 2019, the conventional coaches were converted into LHB coach.

Route & halts
 
 
 
 Pt. Deen Dayal Upadhyaya Junction

Traction
Between Guwahati and Katihar, the train is hauled by a WDP-4 / WDP-4B / WDP-4D of Siliguri Diesel Loco Shed. From Katihar to New Delhi, mostly WAP-4 of Mughalsarai or Ghaziabad-based WAP-5 / WAP-7 locomotive.

Rake sharing
The train shares its rake with 14037/14038 Silchar–New Delhi Poorvottar Sampark Kranti Express.

See also 

 Guwahati railway station
 New Delhi railway station
 Silchar–New Delhi Poorvottar Sampark Kranti Express

References

Transport in Guwahati
Transport in Delhi
Sampark Kranti Express trains
Rail transport in Assam
Rail transport in West Bengal
Rail transport in Bihar
Rail transport in Uttar Pradesh
Rail transport in Delhi
Railway services introduced in 2005